James Jakins (1 October 1886 – 12 December 1948) was an Australian cricketer. He played one first-class match for Tasmania in 1913/14.

See also
 List of Tasmanian representative cricketers

References

External links
 

1886 births
1948 deaths
Australian cricketers
Tasmania cricketers
Cricketers from Melbourne